This is a list of U.S. cities where non-Hispanic whites formed less than half the population in the 2010 census, but no other ethnic or racial group had more people than non-Hispanic whites.  The percentage listed is the percentage of the population that was non-Hispanic whites.

Cities

California
Antioch, California - 35.6%
Cypress, California -43.6%
Dixon, California - 49.3%
El Cerrito, California - 48.3%
Fairfield, California - 35.2%
Fountain Valley, California - 49.2%
Vallejo, California - 25.0%
Suisun City, California - 29.2

Maryland
Cambridge, Maryland - 42.7%
Gaithersburg, Maryland - 40.0%
Salisbury, Maryland - 49.0%
Takoma Park, Maryland - 43.3%

Massachusetts
Boston, Massachusetts - 47.0%

Michigan
Harper Woods, Michigan - 48.5%

Missouri
Grandview, Missouri - 45.0%

Nevada
Las Vegas, Nevada - 47.9% 
North Las Vegas, Nevada - 31.2

Virginia
Newport News, Virginia - 46.0%

Census Designated Places

Maryland
Aspen Hill, Maryland - 34.0%
Cloverly, Maryland - 40.5%
Colesville, Maryland - 35.2%
Columbia, Maryland - 49.0%
Hillandale, Maryland - 35.8%
Reisterstown, Maryland - 48.5%

Nevada
Paradise, Nevada - 46.3%
Spring Valley, Nevada - 48.1%
Whitney, Nevada - 38.4%

References

White
White Americans